Wolof is a language of Senegal, Mauritania, and the Gambia, and the native language of the Wolof people. Like the neighbouring languages Serer and Fula, it belongs to the Senegambian branch of the Niger–Congo language family. Unlike most other languages of the Niger-Congo family, Wolof is not a tonal language.

Wolof is the most widely spoken language in Senegal, spoken natively by the Wolof people (40% of the population) but also by most other Senegalese as a second language. Wolof dialects vary geographically and between rural and urban areas. The principal dialect of Dakar, for instance, is an urban mixture of Wolof, French, and Arabic.

Wolof is the standard spelling and may also refer to the Wolof ethnicity or culture. Now-archaic forms include Volof and Olof.

Geographical distribution

Wolof is spoken by more than 10 million people and about 40 percent (approximately 5 million people) of Senegal's population speak Wolof as their native language. Increased mobility, and especially the growth of the capital Dakar, created the need for a common language: today, an additional 40 percent of the population speak Wolof as a second or acquired language. In the whole region from Dakar to Saint-Louis, and also west and southwest of Kaolack, Wolof is spoken by the vast majority of people. Typically when various ethnic groups in Senegal come together in cities and towns, they speak Wolof. It is therefore spoken in almost every regional and departmental capital in Senegal. Nevertheless, the official language of Senegal is French.

In The Gambia, although about 20–25 percent of the population speak Wolof as a first language, it has a disproportionate influence because of its prevalence in Banjul, the Gambian capital, where 75 percent of the population use it as a first language. Furthermore, in Serekunda, The Gambia's largest town, although only a tiny minority are ethnic Wolofs, approximately 70 percent of the population speaks or understands Wolof.

In Mauritania, about seven percent of the population (approximately 185,000 people) speak Wolof. Most live near or along the Senegal River that Mauritania shares with Senegal.

Classification
Wolof is one of the Senegambian languages, which are characterized by consonant mutation. It is often said to be closely related to the Fula language because of a misreading by Wilson (1989) of the data in Sapir (1971) that have long been used to classify the Atlantic languages.

Varieties
Senegalese/Mauritanian Wolof and Gambian Wolof are distinct national standards: they use different orthographies and use different languages (French vs. English) as their source for technical loanwords. However, both the spoken and written languages are mutually intelligible. Lebu Wolof, on the other hand, is incomprehensible to standard Wolof speakers, a distinction that has been obscured because all Lebu speakers are bilingual in standard Wolof.

Orthography and pronunciation

Note: Phonetic transcriptions are printed between square brackets [] following the rules of the International Phonetic Alphabet (IPA).

The Latin orthography of Wolof in Senegal was set by government decrees between 1971 and 1985. The language institute "Centre de linguistique appliquée de Dakar" (CLAD) is widely acknowledged as an authority when it comes to spelling rules for Wolof. The complete alphabet is A, B, C, D, E, Ë, F, G, H, I, J, K, L, M, N, Ñ, Ŋ, O, P, Q, R, S, T, U, W, X, Y. The letters V and Z are not included in Wolof. 

Wolof is most often written in this orthography, in which phonemes have a clear one-to-one correspondence to graphemes.

Additionally, two other scripts exist: a traditional Arabic-based transcription of Wolof called Wolofal, which dates back to the pre-colonial period and is still used by many people, and Garay, an alphabetic script invented by Assane Faye 1961, which has been adopted by a small number of Wolof speakers.

The first syllable of words is stressed; long vowels are pronounced with more time but are not automatically stressed, as they are in English.

Vowels
The vowels are as follows:

There may be an additional low vowel, or this may be confused with orthographic à.

All vowels may be long (written double) or short.  is written  before a long (prenasalized or geminate) consonant (example làmbi "arena"). When é and ó are written double, the accent mark is often only on the first letter.

Vowels fall into two harmonizing sets according to ATR:  i u é ó ë are +ATR, e o a are the −ATR analogues of é ó ë.  For example,

There are no −ATR analogs of the high vowels i u. They trigger +ATR harmony in suffixes when they occur in the root, but in a suffix, they may be transparent to vowel harmony.

The vowels of some suffixes or enclitics do not harmonize with preceding vowels. In most cases following vowels harmonize with them. That is, they reset the harmony, as if they were a separate word. However, when a suffix/clitic contains a high vowel (+ATR) that occurs after a −ATR root, any further suffixes harmonize with the root. That is, the +ATR suffix/clitic is "transparent" to vowel harmony. An example is the negative -u- in,

where harmony would predict *door-u-më-léén-fë.
That is, I or U behave as if they are their own −ATR analogs.

Authors differ in whether they indicate vowel harmony in writing, as well as whether they write clitics as separate words.

Consonants
Consonants in word-initial position are as follows:

All simple nasals, oral stops apart from q and glottal, and the sonorants l r y w may be geminated (doubled), though geminate r only occurs in ideophones. (Geminate consonants are written double.) Q is inherently geminate and may occur in an initial position; otherwise, geminate consonants and consonant clusters, including nt, nc, nk, nq, are restricted to word-medial and -final position.  In the final place, geminate consonants may be followed by a faint epenthetic schwa vowel.

Of the consonants in the chart above, p d c k do not occur in the intermediate or final position, being replaced by f r s and zero, though geminate pp dd cc kk are common. Phonetic p c k do occur finally, but only as allophones of b j g due to final devoicing.

Minimal pairs:

 bët ("eye") - bëtt ("to find")
 boy ("to catch fire") - boyy ("to be glimmering")
 dag ("a royal servant") - dagg ("to cut")
 dëj ("funeral") - dëjj ("cunt")
 fen ("to (tell a) lie") - fenn ("somewhere, nowhere")
 gal ("white gold") - gall ("to regurgitate")
 goŋ ("baboon") - goŋŋ (a kind of bed) 
 gëm ("to believe") - gëmm ("to close one's eyes")
 Jaw (a family name) - jaww ("heaven")
 nëb ("rotten") - nëbb ("to hide")
 woñ ("thread") - woññ ("to count")

Tones
Unlike most sub-Saharan African languages, Wolof has no tones. Other non-tonal languages of sub-Saharan Africa include Amharic, Swahili and Fula.

Grammar

Notable characteristics

Pronoun conjugation instead of verbal conjugation

In Wolof, verbs are unchangeable stems that cannot be conjugated. To express different tenses or aspects of an action, personal pronouns are conjugated – not the verbs. Therefore, the term temporal pronoun has become established for this part of speech. It is also referred to as a focus form.

Example: The verb dem means "to go" and cannot be changed; the temporal pronoun maa ngi means "I/me, here and now"; the temporal pronoun dinaa means "I am soon / I will soon / I will be soon". With that, the following sentences can be built now: Maa ngi dem. "I am going (here and now)." – Dinaa dem. "I will go (soon)."

Conjugation with respect to aspect instead of tense
In Wolof, tenses like present tense, past tense, and future tense are just of secondary importance and play almost no role. Of crucial importance is the aspect of action from the speaker's point of view. The most vital distinction is whether an action is perfective (finished) or imperfective (still going on from the speaker's point of view), regardless of whether the action itself takes place in the past, present, or future. Other aspects indicate whether an action takes place regularly, whether an action will surely take place and whether an actor wants to emphasize the role of the subject, predicate, or object. As a result, conjugation is done by not tense but aspect. Nevertheless, the term temporal pronoun is usual for such conjugated pronouns although aspect pronoun might be a better term.

For example, the verb dem means "to go"; the temporal pronoun naa means "I already/definitely", the temporal pronoun dinaa means "I am soon / I will soon / I will be soon"; the temporal pronoun damay means "I (am) regularly/usually". The following sentences can be constructed: Dem naa. "I go already / I have already gone." – Dinaa dem. "I will go soon / I am just going to go." – Damay dem. "I usually/regularly/normally/am about to go."

A speaker may express that an action absolutely took place in the past by adding the suffix -(w)oon to the verb (in a sentence, the temporal pronoun is still used in a conjugated form along with the past marker):

Demoon naa Ndakaaru. "I already went to Dakar."

Action verbs versus static verbs and adjectives
Wolof has two main verb classes: dynamic and stative. Verbs are not inflected; instead pronouns are used to mark person, aspect, tense, and focus.

Consonant harmony

Gender
Wolof does not mark sexual gender as grammatical gender: there is one pronoun encompassing the English 'he', 'she', and 'it'. The descriptors bu góor (male / masculine) or bu jigéen (female / feminine) are often added to words like xarit, 'friend', and rakk, 'younger sibling' to indicate the person's sex.

Markers of noun definiteness (usually called "definite articles") agree with the noun they modify. There are at least ten articles in Wolof, some of them indicating a singular noun, others a plural noun. In Urban Wolof, spoken in large cities like Dakar, the article -bi is often used as a generic article when the actual article is not known.

Any loan noun from French or English uses -bi: butik-bi, xarit-bi "the boutique, the friend."

Most Arabic or religious terms use -Ji: Jumma-Ji, jigéen-ji, "the mosque, the girl."

Four nouns referring to persons use -ki/-ñi:' nit-ki, nit-ñi, 'the person, the people"

Plural nouns use -yi: jigéen-yi, butik-yi, "the girls, the boutiques"

Miscellaneous articles: "si, gi, wi, mi, li."

Numerals

Cardinal numbers

The Wolof numeral system is based on the numbers "5" and "10". It is extremely regular in formation, comparable to Chinese. Example: benn "one", juróom "five", juróom-benn "six" (literally, "five-one"), fukk "ten", fukk ak juróom benn "sixteen" (literally, "ten and five one"), ñent-fukk "forty" (literally, "four-ten"). Alternatively, "thirty" is fanweer, which is roughly the number of days in a lunar month (literally "fan" is day and "weer" is moon.)

Ordinal numbers
Ordinal numbers (first, second, third, etc.) are formed by adding the ending –éél (pronounced ayl) to the cardinal number.

For example, two is ñaar and second is ñaaréélThe one exception to this system is "first", which is bu njëk (or the adapted French word premier: përëmye')

Personal pronouns

Temporal pronouns

Conjugation of the temporal pronouns

In urban Wolof, it is common to use the forms of the 3rd person plural also for the 1st person plural.

It is also important to note that the verb follows specific temporal pronouns and precedes others.

Literature

The New Testament was translated into Wolof and published in 1987, second edition 2004, and in 2008 with some minor typographical corrections.

Boubacar Boris Diop published his novel Doomi Golo in Wolof in 2002.

The 1994 song "7 Seconds" by Youssou N'Dour and Neneh Cherry is partially sung in Wolof.

See also

 Pidgin Wolof
 List of proposed etymologies of OK

References

Bibliography
Linguistics
 Harold Torrence: The Clause Structure of Wolof: Insights into the Left Periphery. Amsterdam/Philadelphia: Benjamins, 2013.
 Omar Ka: Wolof Phonology and Morphology. University Press of America, Lanham, Maryland, 1994, .
 Mamadou Cissé: "Graphical borrowing and African realities" in Revue du Musée National d'Ethnologie d'Osaka, Japan, June 2000.
 Mamadou Cissé: "Revisiter 'La grammaire de la langue wolof' d'A. Kobes (1869), ou étude critique d'un pan de l'histoire de la grammaire du wolof.", in Sudlangues Sudlangues.sn, February 2005
 Mc Laughlin, Fiona. "Senegal: urban Wolof then and now." In Urban Contact Dialects and Language Change, pp. 47-65. Routledge, 2022.
 Leigh Swigart: Two codes or one? The insiders' view and the description of codeswitching in Dakar, in Carol M. Eastman, Codeswitching. Clevedon/Philadelphia: Multilingual Matters, .
Carla Unseth: "Vowel Harmony in Wolof" in Occasional Papers in Applied Linguistics. No. 7, 2009.
 Fiona McLaughlin: "Dakar Wolof and the configuration of an urban identity", Journal of African Cultural Studies 14/2, 2001, p. 153–172
 Gabriele Aïscha Bichler: "Bejo, Curay und Bin-bim? Die Sprache und Kultur der Wolof im Senegal (mit angeschlossenem Lehrbuch Wolof)", Europäische Hochschulschriften Band 90, Peter Lang Verlagsgruppe, Frankfurt am Main, Germany 2003, .

 Grammar
 Pathé Diagne: Grammaire de Wolof Moderne. Présence Africaine, Paris, France, 1971.
 Pape Amadou Gaye: Wolof: An Audio-Aural Approach. United States Peace Corps, 1980.
 Amar Samb: Initiation a la Grammaire Wolof. Institut Fondamental d'Afrique Noire, Université de Dakar, Ifan-Dakar, Sénegal, 1983.
 Michael Franke: Kauderwelsch, Wolof für den Senegal – Wort für Wort. Reise Know-How Verlag, Bielefeld, Germany 2002, .
 Michael Franke, Jean Léopold Diouf, Konstantin Pozdniakov: Le wolof de poche – Kit de conversation (Phrasebook/grammar with 1 CD). Assimil, Chennevières-sur-Marne, France, 2004 .
 Jean-Léopold Diouf, Marina Yaguello: J'apprends le Wolof – Damay jàng wolof (1 textbook with 4 audio cassettes). Karthala, Paris, France 1991, .
 Michel Malherbe, Cheikh Sall: Parlons Wolof – Langue et culture. L'Harmattan, Paris, France 1989,  (this book uses a simplified orthography which is not compliant with the CLAD standards; a CD is available).
 Jean-Léopold Diouf: Grammaire du wolof contemporain. Karthala, Paris, France 2003, .
 Fallou Ngom: Wolof. Verlag LINCOM, Munich, Germany 2003, .
 Sana Camara: Wolof Lexicon and Grammar, NALRC Press, 2006, .

 Dictionaries
 Diouf, Jean-Leopold: Dictionnaire wolof-français et français-wolof, Karthala, 2003
 Mamadou Cissé: Dictionnaire Français-Wolof, L’Asiathèque, Paris, 1998, 
 Arame Fal, Rosine Santos, Jean Léonce Doneux: Dictionnaire wolof-français (suivi d'un index français-wolof). Karthala, Paris, France 1990, .
 Pamela Munro, Dieynaba Gaye: Ay Baati Wolof – A Wolof Dictionary. UCLA Occasional Papers in Linguistics, No. 19, Los Angeles, California, 1997.
 Peace Corps Gambia: Wollof-English Dictionary, PO Box 582, Banjul, the Gambia, 1995 (no ISBN; this book refers solely to the dialect spoken in the Gambia and does not use the standard orthography of CLAD).
 Nyima Kantorek: Wolof Dictionary & Phrasebook, Hippocrene Books, 2005,  (this book refers predominantly to the dialect spoken in the Gambia and does not use the standard orthography of CLAD).
 Sana Camara: Wolof Lexicon and Grammar'', NALRC Press, 2006, .

 Official documents
 Government of Senegal, Décret n° 71-566 du 21 mai 1971 relatif à la transcription des langues nationales, modifié par décret n° 72-702 du 16 juin 1972.
 Government of Senegal, Décrets n° 75-1026 du 10 octobre 1975 et n° 85-1232 du 20 novembre 1985 relatifs à l'orthographe et à la séparation des mots en wolof.
 Government of Senegal, Décret n° 2005-992 du 21 octobre 2005 relatif à l'orthographe et à la séparation des mots en wolof.

External links

Wolof resource (Mofeko, Tola Akindipe & Joanna Senghore), Largest online resource to learn Wolof (with Gambian influence)
Easy wolof (iPhone application)
Wolof Language Resources 
An Annotated Guide to Learning the Wolof Language
Wolof Online
A French-Wolof-French dictionary partially available at Google Books.
Firicat.com (an online Wolof to English translator; you can add your own words to this dictionary; it uses almost exclusively the Gambian variants and does not use a standard orthography)
PanAfrican L10n page on Wolof
OSAD spécialisée dans l’éducation nonformelle et l’édition des Ouvrages en Langues nationales 

 
 Senegambian languages
 Languages of the  Gambia
 Languages of Senegal
 Languages of Mauritania
 Wolof people